Hrvoje Benić (born 26 April 1992) is a Croatian water polo player for VK Jug and the Croatian national team.

He participated at the 2019 World Championships.

See also
 List of World Aquatics Championships medalists in water polo

References

External links
 

1992 births
Living people
Croatian male water polo players
World Aquatics Championships medalists in water polo